Abdul Rahman Yusuf (born September 18, 1970) is an Egyptian-Qatari poet who writes original poetry, maintaining the rules of poetry and dedicated to the issues of the Arab nation as well as aesthetics of Arabic poetry.

Life
The third son of the Islamic scholar Yusuf al-Qaradawi, he was born on September 18, 1970. He has been an active participant in several cultural seminars in Egypt and across the Arab world. He published his poems in several Egyptian and Arabic magazines and newspapers.

A campaign leader for Mohammed El Baradei in the 2011 Egyptian revolution, he recalled the moment at which he reached Tahrir Square on 25 January 2011:

Works
He published seven poetry collections so far:
 The bleeding letters, 1992 (نزف الحروف)
 Facing the mirror, 2003 (أمام المرآة)
 A toast to the homeland, 2004 (في صحة الوطن)
 I have nothing to lose, 2005 (لا شيء عندي أخسره)
 Talking plainly, July 2006 (على المكشوف)
 Write the history of tomorrow, November 2006 (اكتب تاريخ المستقبل)

References

External links 
 Abdul Rahman's home page
 Abdul Rahman's Forum

1970 births
Living people
20th-century Egyptian poets
21st-century Egyptian poets
Egyptian male poets
20th-century male writers
21st-century male writers